Omobranchus elongatus, the cloister blenny or chevroned blenny, is a species of combtooth blenny found in coral reefs in the western Pacific and Indian oceans.  This species can reach a length of  SL.  This species can also be found in the aquarium trade.

References

elongatus
Taxa named by Wilhelm Peters 
Fish described in 1855